Ask price, also called offer price, offer, asking price, or simply ask, is the price a seller states they will accept.

The seller may qualify the stated asking price as firm or negotiable. Firm means the seller is implying that the price is fixed and will not change.

In bid and ask, the term ask price is used in contrast to the term bid price. The difference between the bid price and the ask price is called the spread.

Stock exchange 
In the context of stock trading on a stock exchange, the ask price is the lowest price a seller of a stock is willing to accept for a share of that given stock. For over-the-counter stocks, the asking price is the best quoted price at which a market maker is willing to sell a stock.

Mutual funds 
For mutual funds, the asking price is the net asset value plus any sales charges. It is also called asked price or offering price or ask.

Commodities 
The ask price is the lowest price a seller of a commodity is willing to accept for that commodity.

Auctions 
In auctions the ask price is the reservation price. Some auctions may not have such a price. This price is the minimum that the seller will agree to for the object being sold.

See also 
 Bid price
 Bid–offer spread

References

External links 
 Securities and Exchange Commission definition of "ask price"
 Ask price and offer price introduction

Financial economics
Financial markets